A growing region is an area suited by climate and soil conditions to the cultivation of a certain type of crop or plant group.

Most crops are cultivated not in one place only, but in several distinct regions in diverse parts of the world. Cultivation in these areas may be enabled by a large-scale regional climate, or by a unique microclimate.

Growing regions, because of the need for climate consistency, are usually oriented along a general latitude, and in the United States these are often called "belts".

The growing region of a traditional staple crop often has a strong cultural cohesiveness.

Examples
The need for growing fodder has also historically limited livestock to certain agricultural regions.

In Viticulture, American Viticultural Area - AVA regions are a specialized geographic type; and European wine appellations of Protected Geographical Status origin are another.

See also
List of wine-producing regions
Geographical indication
Growing season
Growing degree-day

Agricultural terminology
Agronomy
Soil science
Agricultural soil science
Economic geography
Horticulture
Appellations